Mooka may refer to:

 Mooka, Tochigi, in Japan
 Mooka Railway Mooka Line, in Japan